Feleti Kaitu'u (born 30 December 1994) is an Australian professional rugby union player who plays for the Western Force in Super Rugby and for  in international rugby. His usual playing position is hooker. Kaitu'u was recruited to the Force squad for the Global Rapid Rugby competition in 2020.

Kaitu'u was named in 's team for the 2021 Rugby Championship match against , played on the Gold Coast. He made his test debut in the 65th minute of the match, won 28–26 against the World Cup champions.

Reference list

External links
Rugby.com.au profile
itsrugby.co.uk profile

1994 births
Australian rugby union players
Australia international rugby union players
Australian sportspeople of Tongan descent
Living people
Rugby union hookers
Queensland Country (NRC team) players
Western Force players
Rugby union players from Newcastle, New South Wales